Starting in 2022, Moldova suffered its worst energy crisis since its independence. It is hugely influenced by the 2022 Russian invasion of Ukraine.

History
In October 2022, the Russian state-owned company Gazprom announced it would reduce its gas deliveries to Moldova by 30%, including Transnistria, an unrecognized separatist state supported by Russia and internationally recognized as part of Moldova. This caused a heavy gas deficit in Transnistria that caused several large companies in the separatist republic to cease their activities. In addition, the Transnistrian authorities announced that due to this gas crisis, the Cuciurgan power station, which supplies 70% of government-held Moldova's energy needs, would reduce its power deliveries to 27% of normal.

In early October, Ukraine ceased its electricity exports to Moldova following the destruction of part of Ukraine's electricity system as a result of a mass bombing campaign of Ukrainian civilian and energy infrastructure by Russia. On 24 October, this provoked an electricity deficit in the country. Following this, the Romanian state-owned company Hidroelectrica signed a contract with Moldovan state-owned Energocom company for the delivery of electricity to Moldova at prices considerably lower than the spot market price in Romania. For this to take place, changes in Romanian legislation were required. This is believed to have increased support among Moldovan society for a potential unification of Moldova and Romania.

Due to the energy crisis, protests against the pro-European government led by President Maia Sandu erupted seeking rapprochement with Russia in order to negotiate a better energy deal. Due to this, it has been hypothesised that Russia is using Moldova's energy crisis to serve its geopolitical interests and to destabilize the pro-Western government in power.

On 10 November, during a visit by the President of the European Commission Ursula von der Leyen to Moldova, a 250 million-euro financial package from the European Union (EU) was announced to help Moldova deal with its energy crisis. Of these, 100 million would be grants, other 100 million would be loans and another 50 million would be destined to help Moldova's most vulnerable citizens.

A few times parts of Moldova were in blackout due to Russian shelling of critical infrastructure of Ukraine.

On 16 February 2023, following the restructuring of the Ministry of Infrastructure and Regional Development during the establishment of the Recean Cabinet, the Ministry of Energy of Moldova was created, with Victor Parlicov as energy minister.

See also
 Economic impact of the 2022 Russian invasion of Ukraine
 Moldova–Russia relations
 Transnistria conflict

References

2022 in Moldova
2023 in Moldova
Energy crises
Energy in Moldova
Economic history of Moldova
Events affected by the 2022 Russian invasion of Ukraine
Moldova–Russia relations